HMS Jason  was a wooden screw corvette launched on 10 November 1859 for the Royal Navy at Devonport Dockyard. She was broken up in 1877.

References

External links
Photograph of HMS "Jason" (1859)

 

Ships built in Plymouth, Devon
Jason-class corvettes
1859 ships